ConVal Regional High School (short for Contoocook Valley Regional High School) is a high school in Peterborough, New Hampshire that serves nine surrounding towns: Antrim, Bennington, Dublin, Francestown, Greenfield, Hancock, Peterborough, Sharon and Temple. The principal is Heather McKillop. ConVal has approximately 720 students and has had several notable sports and academic teams in the past. ConVal's mascot is the cougar. The school colors are blue and gold.

History
The school was opened in 1970. It was designed by Nashua architects Carter & Woodruff.

Academics
ConVal High School has over six different academic departments, including the ATC or CATE (Career and Technical Education) programs.

TASC
ConVal has developed the TASC intervention block. The Teachers in Academic Service Centers (TASC) block is a program where students 'Book' teachers that they need help or support from. The ConVal TASC model has been implemented by over 40 schools across the nation.

ConVal's TASC program was developed as a way to fit RTI, i.e. opportunities for relearning, extensions and enrichment as well as mentoring and advising, effectively into the school day.

Notable alumni

Sam Huntington, actor
Steve Sawyer (1974), environmentalist and activist
Brian Viglione, one half of the band The Dresden Dolls
Adam Warren, comic book artist and writer, known for his version of The Dirty Pair

Notable faculty
 (former) Bob McQuillen, contra dance musician and composer, National Heritage Fellow

References

External links
Official website

Schools in Hillsborough County, New Hampshire
Public high schools in New Hampshire
Peterborough, New Hampshire